Events from the year 1530 in India.

Events
 Babur's death ends his reign as Mughal emperor, and is succeeded by Humayun.

Births

Deaths
 December 26 – Babur, Mughal Emperor (born 1483).

See also

 Timeline of Indian history

References 

 
India